Volos/Nea Ionia Airport  was a joint public and military airport, situated at Nea Ionia, Volos. It was established in 1948 with a runway of 970m./3,190 ft. In 1954 the runway length was reduced to 650m./2,138 ft. and at that time the airport was exclusively used by the Hellenic Army. The airport finally closed in 1981, its infrastructure abandoned and left to decay. The runway was located where the new Volos Ring Road is situated today.

The airport was replaced by Nea Anchialos National Airport, which began operations in 1991 and sought to cover the needs of the area of Central Greece, filling in the gap of the old defunct Volos Airport.

Former Airlines and destinations 
 TAE Greek National Airlines (Athens)

References

External links
 Volos Army Airport
 LGVO

Transport infrastructure in Thessaly
Defunct airports in Greece
Volos